This list consists of activists who are known as Chinese dissidents. The label is primarily applied to intellectuals who "push the boundaries" of society or criticize the policies of the government. Examples of the former include Wei Hui and Jia Pingwa, whose sexually explicit writings reflect dissent from traditional Chinese culture rather than the laws of the state.

Detained and jailed people
Many Chinese political activists have been detained or jailed or exiled for their pro-democracy or rights defending activities. They include the following notable activists.

Others
Michael Anti (journalist), proponent of freedom of the press in China
Chai Ling
Chang Ping
Chaohua Wang
Chen Guangcheng
Fang Lizhi
Feng Congde
Feng Zhenghu
Gao Xingjian, recipient of the 2000 Nobel Prize in Literature
Gao Yu (journalist)
Gao Zhisheng
Gui Minhai, publisher and writer of books on Chinese politics
Guo Wengui, also known as Miles Guo
Han Dongfang
Jiao Guobiao, former professor of Peking University and the author of Denouncing the Central Propaganda Department (of the Communist Party of China)
Li Hongkuan
Li Lu
Li Qiaochu
Li Zehou, scholar of philosophy and intellectual history
Liu Binyan
Alex Liu (Yongchuan Liu), data scientist
Lu Jinghua, former merchant who became involved in the Beijing Workers' Autonomous Federation in 1989. She later lived in New York. Attempted to return to Beijing in June 1993 but was refused entry and sent back to US.
Murong Xuecun, writer and critic of censorship
Shen Tong 
Su Changlan
Su Xiaokang
Tang Baiqiao
Tashi Wangchuk, sentenced to 5 years in prison in May 2018 for "inciting separatism" after speaking to The New York Times about his concerns over the current state of Tibetan culture and language in China.
Wang Bingzhang
 Wang Meiyu (王美雨), democracy activist who died in police custody under suspicious circumstances in September 2019 after having been arrested for "picking quarrels and provoking trouble" in July 2019 when he was protesting for universal suffrage and calling for the resignation of Xi Jinping and Li Keqiang
Wang Ruowang
Wu Fan
Harry Wu
Wu'erkaixi
Xie Wanjun, founding member of the Democracy Party of China
Xiong Yan (dissident)
Xu Jiatun
Xue Fei (host)
Yan Jiaqi
Yang Jianli
Youming Che
Yu Jie, dissident writer
Zhang Boli
Zheng Yi (writer)
Zhou Fengsuo

See also

Tank Man
Human rights in the People's Republic of China
Politics of the People's Republic of China
Tiananmen Square protests of 1989
Women’s Roles during the Tiananmen Square Protests of 1989
Liu Xiaobo
Xinjiang re-education camps

References

External links
[China: List of Political Prisoners Detained or Imprisoned as of November 5, 2017 (1,414 cases) http://www.cecc.gov/sites/chinacommission.house.gov/files/documents/CECC%20Pris%20List_20171105_1414.pdf]
List of top Chinese dissidents
Human Rights in China
IFEX: Monitoring Censorship in China
Photos of Chinese dissidents

 
Chinese dissidents
Chinese dissidents